Lane's leaf-toed gecko (Phyllodactylus lanei) is a species of gecko. It is endemic to Mexico.

References

Phyllodactylus
Reptiles of Mexico
Reptiles described in 1935
Taxa named by Hobart Muir Smith